The 1996 UCLA Bruins football team represented the University of California, Los Angeles in the 1996 NCAA Division I-A football season. The season was highlighted by the 25-yard Skip Hicks touchdown run in the second overtime that won the game for the Bruins over the crosstown-rival USC Trojans.

Schedule

Game summaries

USC Trojans

Six straight wins for the Bruins over the Trojans.

Roster

References

UCLA
UCLA Bruins football seasons
UCLA Bruins football